Charles Benedict Calvert (August 23, 1808 – May 12, 1864) was an American politician who was a U.S. Representative from the sixth district of Maryland, serving one term from 1861 to 1863. He was an early backer of the inventors of the telegraph, and in 1856 he founded the Maryland Agricultural College, the first agricultural research college in America, now known as the University of Maryland. He was a direct descendant of the Lords Baltimore, proprietary governors of the Province of Maryland from 1631 until 1776.

Early life
Calvert was born on August 23, 1808, at his family's estate at Riversdale, Maryland. His mother was Rosalie Eugenia Stier (1778–1821), the daughter of a wealthy Flemish aristocrat, Baron Henri Joseph Stier (1743–1821) and his wife Marie-Louise Peeters. The Stiers had fled to America in the late eighteenth century as French Republican armies occupied their hometown of Antwerp. Calvert's father, the wealthy planter George Calvert (1768–1838), was the son of the Loyalist politician Benedict Swingate Calvert (c.1730–1788) – a natural son of the penultimate Proprietary Governor of Maryland, Charles Calvert, 5th Baron Baltimore – and Benedict's wife Elizabeth Calvert (1731–1788).

Education
Calvert completed his preparatory studies at Bladensburg Academy of Maryland. Later, he received a certificate of completion from the University of Virginia at Charlottesville in 1827, even though he attended the university spuriously, and engaged in agricultural pursuits and stock breeding.

Science and agriculture
Calvert inherited a plantation from his family, called Riverdale. He "introduced scientific agriculture to the plantation, adopted ideas published in journals and newspapers, exhibited at county and state fairs, and introduced a number of his own innovations. He could implement these innovations because of the large number of slaves – as many as 55 in 1850 – at his command."

Calvert was a strong backer of the inventors of the telegraph, Samuel Morse and Alfred Vail. On April 9, 1844, Morse and Vail successfully tested their device by transmitting a message from the nation's capital to the Calvert home, Riversdale. This test came 45 days before the more celebrated event when Morse sent the message "What hath God wrought?" from Washington to Baltimore, along telegraph lines that ran above the Baltimore and Ohio Railroad line near Riversdale.

Calvert became president of the Prince George's County, Maryland Agricultural Society and the Maryland State Agricultural Society, and served as vice president of the United States Pomological Society. He founded the first agricultural research college in America (later known as the Maryland Agricultural College at College Park, and presently known as the University of Maryland, College Park) which was chartered in 1856. Calvert was also one of the early advocates for the establishment of the United States Department of Agriculture.

Politics

Calvert served as a member of the Maryland House of Delegates in 1839, 1843, and 1844. Calvert was elected as a Unionist to the Thirty-seventh Congress representing Maryland's Sixth Congressional District in an election held on June 13, 1861. In the election of November 4, 1863, he sought reelection as a Conditional (Conservative) Unionist candidate in the Fifth Congressional District (the Sixth District having been abolished), but was defeated.   After leaving office, he resumed agricultural pursuits until his death on May 12, 1864, at Riversdale, and is interred in Calvert Cemetery.

References

Sources
. Retrieved 2009-03-31

External links

 Calvert Family Tree. Retrieved July 10, 2013
 The Calverts and Stiers of Riversdale. Retrieved November 2010

1808 births
1864 deaths
American slave owners
Members of the Maryland House of Delegates
Members of the United States House of Representatives from Maryland
American people of Belgian descent
Presidents of the University of Maryland, College Park
People of Maryland in the American Civil War
People from Riverdale Park, Maryland
University of Virginia alumni
Charles Benedict Calvert
Maryland Unionists
Unionist Party members of the United States House of Representatives
19th-century American politicians